The Wildflower is a 2022 Nigerian film produced by Vincent Okonkwo and directed by Biodun Stephen under the distribution company of Film One Entertainment. The movie unveils the different domestic abuses faced by women in the society. It stars Toyin Abraham, Deyemi Okanlawon, Etinosa Idemudia, Nosa Rex and Zubby Michael.

Synopsis 
The film revolves around three assaulted women who are living in the same compound. The movie took a new dimension when one of them speak up and it sparked a huge revolution.

Premiere 
Though the movie was premiered on 27 May 2022 nationwide to mixed reviews from the audience.The movie generated forty million naira from the box office.

Cast 
Damilare Kuku
Deyemi Okanlawon
Toyin Abraham
Sandra Okunzuwa
Zubby Michael
Etinosa Idemudia
Nosa Rex
Imoh Eboh
Kiki Omeili
Eso Dike
Angel Unigwe
Rachel Emem Isaac.

References 

2022 films
Nigerian drama films
Domestic violence in Nigeria
English-language Nigerian films